Moerckia is a genus of liverworts belonging to the family Moerckiaceae.

The genus was first described by Gottsche.

The species of this genus are found in Northern Hemisphere.

Species:
 Moerckia hibernica (Hook.) Gottsche

References

Pallaviciniales
Liverwort genera